The Johnstown Inclined Plane is a  funicular in Johnstown, Cambria County, in the U.S. state of Pennsylvania. The incline and its two stations connect the city of Johnstown, situated in a valley at the confluence of the Stonycreek and the Little Conemaugh rivers, to the borough of Westmont on Yoder Hill. The Johnstown Inclined Plane is billed as the "world's steepest vehicular inclined plane". It can carry automobiles and passengers, up or down a slope with a grade of 71.9%. The travel time between stations is 90 seconds.

After a catastrophic flood in 1889, the Johnstown Inclined Plane was completed in 1891 to serve as an escape route from floods in the valley, as well as a convenient mode of transportation for residents of the new communities above the valley. It was operated by Cambria Iron Company and its successor Bethlehem Steel until 1935, when it was sold to the borough of Westmont. The incline was briefly shut down in 1962 when its supply of power from Bethlehem Steel was terminated.

Twice in its history, the Johnstown Inclined Plane fulfilled its role as a means of evacuation from floods—once in 1936 and again in 1977. The incline was listed on the National Register of Historic Places in 1973 and was designated a Historic Mechanical Engineering Landmark in 1994. It had major renovations in 1962 and from 1983 to 1984.

Design 
The Johnstown Inclined Plane was designed by Hungarian-American engineer Samuel Diescher, who had also designed the Duquesne, Castle Shannon and Fort Pitt Inclines in Pittsburgh. The funicular consists of a parallel set of  broad gauge railroad tracks with a 70.9% grade or an angle of 35 degrees and 28 minutes from the horizontal. The rails are supported by 720  railroad ties made from Southern Yellow Pine. The incline is illuminated at night by 114 high-pressure sodium-vapor lamps mounted along the sides of tracks. There was a stairway between the tracks with 966 steps; this was removed circa 1963. Two cars traverse the slope; as one descends, the other ascends and acts as a counterweight. While the cars are open to the elements, an enclosed seating area with a bench is situated along the outer side of the incline. A  electric motor drives the drum, simultaneously winding and unwinding the cable, to propel the incline. The Johnstown Inclined Plane is unusual in that the motor and winch are located at a 90-degree angle to the incline instead of directly underneath it. Operation of the incline is controlled via a foot pedal located in a booth in the upper station.

An emergency brake engages if the air pressure needed to control the incline is insufficient; the brake also engages if a dead man's switch is tripped in the operator's booth. In addition to the hauling cables, a  safety cable capable of withstanding  is also connected to the cars.

History

Background and construction 
Inclines are common in Europe, and immigrants, like the German, Slavic, and Welsh people who settled near Johnstown, remembered them from their native lands and brought the concept to the United States. The earliest inclines in the United States were a series of 10 that were built in the 1830s as part of the Allegheny Portage Railroad. The portage railroad carried canal boats over the Allegheny Mountains to connect the canals from Pittsburgh to the ones from Philadelphia. Pittsburgh at one time also had "at least 17" inclines—some carried passengers, others freight, while another two inclines (like the Nunnery Hill Incline) were curved.

On May 31, 1889, the South Fork Dam collapsed upstream of Johnstown on the Little Conemaugh River. The resulting deluge devastated the city, killing 2,209 people. As the city rebuilt, the Cambria Iron Company started work on a residential development atop Yoder Hill. To provide easy transportation on the steep slope for residents of the new community of Westmont, the company constructed an inclined plane. In addition to being a convenient mode of transportation, the Johnstown Inclined Plane doubled as an escape route in event of flood. Diescher was hired by Cambria Iron to design the incline. The rails used in the incline were manufactured in Johnstown at Cambria Iron, and many of the construction tools handcrafted there. The  Inclined Plane Bridge was built to span the Stoneycreek River to provide access to the lower station of the incline. Originally named the Cambria Inclined Plane, the Johnstown Inclined Plane opened on June 1, 1891 and cost $133,296 to build. The convenience the incline provided stimulated a rapid growth of population in Westmont and made the borough one of the country's first suburbs. Over 40 million trips were taken on the incline in its first 80 years of operation.

Use 
The incline's original steam engine was disconnected on January 6, 1912, and replaced with an electric motor. The cars used on the incline were originally double-deckers, but were reconfigured into a single-decker design in 1921. The double-decker cars had horses and wagons riding on the main, upper deck and passengers riding in a compartment below. Only one human fatality has occurred at the incline; it was determined that the incident was not caused by the incline itself. There were two incidents in the 1920s when horses aboard the incline became spooked and leapt from the car onto the tracks. Bethlehem Steel, the successor to Cambria Iron, sold the Johnstown Inclined Plane to the borough of Westmont in April 1935. On March 17, 1936, nearly 4,000 people were evacuated from Johnstown to higher ground via the incline as the Stoneycreek and Conemaugh Rivers overflowed their banks. The floodwaters continued downstream and eventually reached Pittsburgh. From February 1938 to July 1953, the Johnstown Traction Company operated transit buses from Johnstown to Westmont with the "fully loaded public buses" being carried by the incline. Bethlehem Steel stopped supplying electricity to the Johnstown Inclined Plane when the factory switched to "an incompatible power system", forcing the incline to close on January 31, 1962. Because of public pressure to keep the incline operating, it was reopened in July 1962 after extensive renovation, in which the electric motor was rewound, ties were replaced, and the cars were repainted.

The Johnstown Inclined Plane was listed on the National Register of Historic Places on June 18, 1973. On July 20, 1977, the incline was again used as an escape route, evacuating residents from the valley amid rising floodwaters. It also carried "boats, emergency personnel, and equipment down to the valley to aid in rescue operations". The incline was again sold for $1 by Westmont borough on March 8, 1983, to the Cambria County Transit Authority, now CamTran. CamTran initiated a $4.2 million renovation on September 7, 1983, replacing "the incline's foundation piers, structural steel, and track." The renovations were completed on August 22, 1984, and the incline was rededicated on September 6. It was designated an Historic Mechanical Engineering Landmark by the American Society of Mechanical Engineers (ASME) in September 1994. A footbridge spanning Pennsylvania Route 56 between the incline and Vine Street was opened around the same time. On September 1, 2000, the incline was closed when the Pennsylvania Department of Transportation (PennDOT) undertook an $2.3 million renovation of the bridge and its access road. It was reopened in April 2001, but again closed in September to allow PennDOT to finish repairs to the bridge deck. The repairs were completed on December 14, 2001. A strong thunderstorm disrupted power to the incline on April 16, 2010, stranding the cars and two passengers almost halfway down the slope. The rescue took three hours, and ended when firefighters rappelled down the tracks to reach the car. The Johnstown Inclined Plane was closed from September 9 to October 14, 2010, for the installation of a new  "hoist brake shaft." From October 29 to October 31, 2012, CamTran shut down the incline fearing power outages due to the passage of Hurricane Sandy. During the annual Thunder in the Valley motorcycle rally, two resistors failed and stopped the incline near the stations on June 28, 2014. Repairs took approximately a month after consultants diagnosed the failure. Sensor issues briefly disrupted service in August 2014 and, again, December 2014 forcing the incline to start its winter maintenance period early.

Refurbishment 
In 2021, the incline closed for a two year project to extensively renovate the incline at a cost of more than $12 million.  The refurbishment included restoration of the cars, a complete overhaul of the mechanical and electrical systems, and replacement all the track ties.  The project was funded by a variety of state and federal grants, and donations from local foundations.

Current operations 

With the growing popularity of the automobile and construction of new roads, ridership on the incline diminished. It was losing $25,000 a year by 1961. Since the 1980s, the incline has become one of the main tourist attractions in Johnstown, with people visiting the incline to "ride for fun, nostalgia and novelty." Primarily used for tourism, the incline's use by commuters, who bike or walk to work, has also increased. CamTran's Route 18 transit bus offers connections between the incline and downtown Johnstown. , the cost for a ride on the incline is $3 or $5 for a roundtrip. The one way fare for automobiles $8. The incline takes around 90 seconds to travel between stations. The same trip takes 10 minutes by automobile. In 2017, the Johnstown Inclined Plane had an annual ridership of 63,764 passengers, a decrease of 2.3 percent from the previous year.

The upper station has a gift shop selling souvenirs and snacks. A visitor center is located adjacent to the station. The mechanical room housing the incline's hoisting mechanism can be viewed from windows in the gift shop and the visitor center lobby. An observation deck providing views of the incline, the city, and the valley is located on the opposite side of the station from the visitor center. Two hiking trails and several mountain bike trails allow visitors to recreate on the hillside. One of the hiking trails is a sculpture trail, with works created in 1989 by local artist James Wolfe, who used remnants of the Bethlehem Steel factory in Johnstown. The mountain bike trails are a series of downhill style trails that all end at the lower Inclined Plane Station.  They are unique in that they are one of the only trail systems with lift service provided bu public transportation.

See also 

 List of funicular railways
 List of Historic Mechanical Engineering Landmarks
 National Register of Historic Places listings in Cambria County, Pennsylvania

Explanatory notes 

A.  Various other sources often use 71.9 percent as the grade of the incline.

Citations

General sources

External links 

 Johnstown Inclined Plane

8 ft gauge railways in the United States
Buildings and structures in Johnstown, Pennsylvania
Funicular railways in the United States
Heritage railroads in Pennsylvania
Historic Mechanical Engineering Landmarks
Rail infrastructure on the National Register of Historic Places in Pennsylvania
Public transportation in Pennsylvania
Railway lines opened in 1891
Inclined Plane
Tourist attractions in Johnstown, Pennsylvania
Articles containing video clips
National Register of Historic Places in Cambria County, Pennsylvania
Cableways on the National Register of Historic Places
1891 establishments in Pennsylvania